On Tuesday evening 18 November 1975 an Irish Republican Army (IRA) unit nicknamed the Balcombe Street Gang, without warning, threw a bomb into Walton's Restaurant in Walton Street, Knightsbridge, London, killing two people and injuring almost two dozen others.

Background

The IRA began a bombing campaign in Britain in 1973 when they exploded a car bomb outside the Old Bailey on 8 March of that year. According to the leader of the Balcombe Street unit, the first bombing they carried out was the Guildford pub bombings on 5 October 1974, which killed five people and injured over 60 others. In February 1975, the Provisional Irish Republican Army agreed to a truce. Before the truce, the IRA Active service unit (ASU), later dubbed the Balcombe Street Gang (because of the December 1975 Balcombe Street siege), had been bombing targets in England since autumn 1974, particularly in London and Surrey. In total the unit carried out around 40 bomb and gun attacks on mainland Britain between October 1974 - December 1975.

Bombing
After the 1975 IRA–British Army truce began to break, the IRA's Balcombe Street ASU stepped up its bombing and shooting campaign on mainland Britain. On the night of 18 November 1975 the unit chose to bomb Walton's Restaurant, in Walton Street, Chelsea. At approximately 21:50 in the evening, an explosive device was thrown by IRA Volunteers through the window of the restaurant. Two civilians, Audrey Edgson (aged 45) and Theodore Williams (aged 49), were killed. The explosive device injured 23 other people, the oldest of them 71 years of age. The IRA used miniature ball bearings within the bomb to maximise injuries. Two persons, a man and woman, died at St. Stephen's Hospital shortly after being taken there.
According to Dr. Laurence Martin, the consultant in charge of the casualty department in St. Stephen's Hospital, four of those injured required emergency operations. Martin reportedly said: "We have been involved with nine bomb incidents in the past two years but this is the worst".

Senior Scotland Yard official, James Nevin, deputy head of the bomb squad, said that the bomb used in the attack had been a "shrapnel‐like device" containing three pounds of explosives.

Aftermath

This was the Balcombe Street gang's last major bomb attack during their fourteen-month bombing campaign of the British mainland. The IRA units bombing campaign would come to an end in December 1975 when they were caught at the Balcombe Street Siege which is where the unit got its name from.

See also
 Chronology of Provisional Irish Republican Army actions (1970–79)

References

External links
 Contemporary television news coverage

Explosions in 1975
1975 in London
Provisional IRA bombings in London
Attacks on restaurants in the United Kingdom
1975 crimes in the United Kingdom
November 1975 events in the United Kingdom
20th century in the Royal Borough of Kensington and Chelsea
November 1975 crimes
Building bombings in London